Sagara Kumara (born 24 January 1977) is a Sri Lankan cricketer. He played in 61 first-class matches between 1996 and 2007. He made his Twenty20 debut on 17 August 2004, for Tamil Union Cricket and Athletic Club in the 2004 SLC Twenty20 Tournament. He is now an umpire and stood in matches in the 2016–17 Districts One Day Tournament.

References

External links
 

1977 births
Living people
Sri Lankan cricketers
Sri Lankan cricket umpires
Moratuwa Sports Club cricketers
Tamil Union Cricket and Athletic Club cricketers
People from Matara, Sri Lanka